Quilla may refer to:
 Barranquilla, or Quilla for short, a city in Colombia
 Quilla (musician) (born 1982), Canadian musician
 Quilla Constance (born 1980), British artist
 Mama Quilla, Inca deity

See also 
 Qila
 Quella
 Kwila